Homocapsaicin is a capsaicinoid and analog and congener of capsaicin in chili peppers (Capsicum). Like capsaicin it is an irritant. Homocapsaicin accounts for about 1% of the total capsaicinoids mixture and has about half the pungency of capsaicin. Pure homocapsaicin is a lipophilic colorless odorless crystalline to waxy compound. On the Scoville scale it has 8,600,000 SHU (Scoville heat units). Homocapsaicin isolated from chili pepper has been found in two isomeric forms, both with a carbon-carbon double bond at the 6 position (numbered from the amide carbon) on the 10-carbon acyl chain. One isomer has an additional carbon, a methyl group, at the 8 position and the other has a methyl group at the 9 position. Homocapsaicin (6-ene-8-methyl) is the more abundant isomer. Homocapsaicin with the double bond at the 7 position has never been found in nature, though its structure is widely reported on the Internet and in the scientific literature. Details of this misidentification have been published.

See also 
 Dihydrocapsaicin
 Nordihydrocapsaicin
 Homodihydrocapsaicin
 Scoville scale
 Pepper spray
 Spice

References

External links 
 Molecule of the Month

Phenols
Capsaicinoids
Phenol ethers